The Daniel Smith House is located in Prescott, Wisconsin.

The original section of this house, built in about 1855, is a wood-frame structure built on a stone foundation. It displays many features found in the Greek Revival style of architecture, including: low-pitch gable ends, fluted pilaster corner boards, boxes cornice with dentils and a plain frieze, and a full-front porch with Doric columns. In about 1870 a one-story clapboarded addition was made to the southwest corner of the house. A water tower, located to the northeast of the house, a gazebo located to the west of the south, and rock walls were built in about 1903.

The Daniel Smith house is locally significant due to its association with Prescott, Wisconsin's early settlement and historical development. The owners of the house between its construction in about 1855 and 1889 were instrumental in the establishment and support of many of the city's earliest commercial, civic, social, educational, governmental, and political activities.

History
The house was originally built for Daniel Smith, a local politician. His wife, Salome, also operated a school in it. Another politician, Norman Dunbar, purchased the house in 1864. Dunbar later sold it to Matthew H. Dill in 1871, who lived in it until 1889.

The house was added to the National Register of Historic Places in 1984 and to the State Register of Historic Places in 1989.

References

Houses on the National Register of Historic Places in Wisconsin
School buildings on the National Register of Historic Places in Wisconsin
National Register of Historic Places in Pierce County, Wisconsin
Schools in Pierce County, Wisconsin
Greek Revival architecture in Wisconsin
Houses completed in 1855